Millersville may refer to:

 Millersville, California
 Millersville, Illinois
 Millersville, Indiana
 A former settlement on Jarvis Island in the Pacific Ocean called Millersville
 Millersville, Maryland
 Millersville, Michigan
 Millersville, Missouri
 Millersville, North Carolina
 Millersville, Ohio
 Millersville, Pennsylvania
 Millersville, Tennessee
 Millersville, West Virginia
 Millersville, Wyoming
 Millersville University of Pennsylvania, a public university